Jose Mari Victor Espino Silayan (born August 1, 1992), better known as Victor Silayan and also Jome Silayan, is a Filipino actor and commercial model. He was a Regal baby and also a former artist of TV5. Silayan is recognized as one of the underwear endorsers of clothing brand Bench and is notable for his appearances in Old Spice advertisements.

Personal life
He is the grandson of the late veteran actor Vic Silayan, nephew of the late beauty queen turned actress, Rosario Silayan-Bailon and the youngest of three children of Ruben Victor Silayan and Roxanne Espino.

Education

Silayan finished grade and high school in De La Salle Santiago Zobel School in Alabang, Muntinlupa. He took up Fine Arts in UST but shifted as an Economics and Applied Corporate Management student at De La Salle University – Manila where he's into mixed martial arts (Jiu Jitsu, Muay Thai and Judo), painting, sculpting, photography and music. He was a member of the Muay Thai varsity team. He's now in third year.

Television career
Silayan was named TV5's Primetime Prince. His first project in the network was The Sisters, wherein he portrayed the partner of Eula Caballero's character. 

Before he signed a contract with TV5 in 2011, Silayan was offered to play the role of Lumad in GMA Network's historical series Amaya, but he turned it down in favor of his studies and the role went to Mikael Daez.

After having his contract with TV5 expired, Silayan became a freelancer and transferred to ABS-CBN in 2015.

In 2022, he officially made his first appearance on GMA Network, starting with his guesting on Artikulo 247.

Filmography

Television

Movies

References

External links
 

1992 births
Living people
De La Salle University alumni
Filipino male models
Filipino male television actors
Filipino male film actors
TV5 (Philippine TV network) personalities
Participants in Philippine reality television series
Reality show winners
ABS-CBN personalities
GMA Network personalities